Mykhailo Brodsky (born April 5, 1959 in Kyiv, in the Ukrainian SSR of the Soviet Union) is a Ukrainian politician, leader of the Party of Free Democrats and businessman.

Biography
Brodsky was a self-nominated candidate in the 2004 Ukrainian presidential election. Chair of the "Yabluko" ("Apple") Party in 2003–2005. Was a national deputy of Ukraine, 1998–2002. Was a chair of the publishing house "Kyivskie Vedmosti" in 1998, but lost control of it after being jailed on corruption charges. Main policy is opposition to "oligarchs", and declared when registering that he was running for president in 2004 to bar (then) Prime Minister of Ukraine, Viktor Yanukovych, from power. Brodskyy allied himself with Yulia Tymoshenko before and during the Orange Revolution (in 2006 he was elected as a deputy of the Kyiv City Council representing the Yulia Tymoshenko Bloc), but broke with her before the snap parliamentary elections of September 2007. In 2007, he publicly accused Tymoshenko of trying to bribe judges of the Constitutional Court and of selling places on election lists.

Brodskyy was a candidate for President of Ukraine in the 2010 Ukrainian presidential elections nominated by the Party of Free Democrats, during the election he received 0,06% of the votes.

On March 24, 2010 the Azarov Government appointed Brodskyy head of the State Committee of Ukraine on Regulatory Policy and Entrepreneurship.

References

External links
 Blog by Mykhailo Brodskiy 
 Michael Brodsky, "cover" Ukrainian smugglers, framed his relative

1959 births
Living people
Businesspeople from Kyiv
Party of Free Democrats politicians
Candidates in the 2004 Ukrainian presidential election
Candidates in the 2010 Ukrainian presidential election
Politicians from Kyiv